The Ms. Pat Show is an American television sitcom created by Jordan E. Cooper and Patricia "Ms. Pat" Williams that premiered on the streaming service BET+ on August 12, 2021. The show is based on the comedy and life story of comedian Ms. Pat as a convicted felon from the streets of Atlanta turned reluctant suburban mother. On September 2, 2021, BET+ renewed the series for a second season which premiered on August 11, 2022. On July 6, 2022, BET+ renewed the series for a third season, which premiered on February 23, 2023. The show was also nominated for Outstanding Directing for a Comedy Series at the 74th Primetime Emmy Awards in 2022.

Premise
The show is set in Ms. Pat's real-life hometown of Plainfield, Indiana. It follows Ms. Pat's fictional family, the Carsons: Pat (Ms. Pat); her husband (J. Bernard Calloway); her sister (Tami Roman); and Pat's children (Brittany Inge, Vince Swann, Briyana Guadalupe, and Theodore Barnes).

A modern day "Archie Bunker", Pat sometimes struggles to adjust with the changing times and ways of her conservative hometown in Indiana. Although blunt and sometimes hardheaded, Pat loves her family and has an open-minded side that helps her to succeed as a black woman in a suburban white neighborhood.

Cast

Main
 Ms. Pat as Patricia "Pat" Ford Carson, the matriarch of the Carson household. She, like Ms. Pat in real life, grew up in rough conditions in Atlanta, had two children when she was a teenager, and moved to Plainfield with her husband with whom she has two more children. While her older kids' father abused her and provided her with little to no support, her husband Terry loves her and acts as the loving partner she never had with her older kids' father. Patricia has four children: Ashley and Brandon, from her first relationship with Lloyd; and Janelle and Junebug, from her marriage to Terry.
 J. Bernard Calloway as Terry Carson, Patricia's well-meaning husband. He is based on Ms. Pat's husband, Garrett. Though his wife grew up with a lack of a strong support system, he provides her with the real love and stability that she never had during her turbulent childhood.
 Tami Roman as Denise Ford, Patricia's free-loading sister who lives with the family. Often a source of comedic tension between Ms. Pat and Terry, she struggles to keep a job.
 Vince Swann as Brandon James, Patricia's sweet, but dimwitted son from a previous relationship with Patricia's ex-boyfriend from Atlanta. He is based on Ms. Pat's son, Nikia.
 Briyana Guadalupe as Janelle Carson, Terry and Patricia's sour and intellectual daughter who is almost 17 years old. She is based on Ms. Pat's daughter, Garrianna.
 Theodore John Barnes as Junebug Carson, Terry and Patricia's cheerful youngest child, who is 14 years old and obsessed with social media. He is based on Ms. Pat's son Garrett "Junebug," Jr.

Recurring
 Brittany Inge as Ashley James, Patricia's eldest child from her previous relationship as a teenager who is a therapist. She and her mother have a rocky relationship toward the beginning of the show due to their disagreement over Ashley being a lesbian, but Pat grows to accept her identity. She is based on Ms. Pat's daughter Ashley.
 Reagan Pasternak as Elizabeth Patterson, the PTO chair and best friend to Pat and Denise. Well-to-do with a past of her own, she is also Ryan’s mom. Elizabeth is initially portrayed as the straight-laced opposite of her new neighbor Pat, but she soon becomes Pat and Denise's closest friend in the neighborhood and enthusiastically helps them in a few schemes.
 Robert Curtis Brown as Principal Horner, the principal at Ridgewood High School. He becomes at odds with Pat and Janelle when he makes racist assumptions during a meeting with them. Denise recognizes him at a PTO meeting from when he offered her a threesome on Christian Mingle.
 Lindsey Pearlman as Martha, Principal Horner's assistant at Ridgewood High School. She struggles to adapt to black culture and mistakes Janelle's name as "Janeesha" and "Janiqua." At a PTO meeting, fellow participant Elizabeth reveals that Martha has a criminal record. Martha was one of actress Lindsey Pearlman's last roles before her death in 2022.
 Gavin Bedell as Ryan Patterson, one of Junebug's friends. He is the son of the PTO chair and first appears on the scene when enlisted to help Junebug with one of Ms. Pat’s schemes.
 Nicholas Ryan Hernandez as Sergio, another of Junebug's friends. He learns a very important lesson about using the n-word. 
 Josh Dunn as Jesse, Janelle's non-binary friend from the debate team who butts heads with their religious and unaccepting mother, Jackie. Jesse helps Pat to learn how to address people with more political correctness.
 Jonathan Horne as Lee Grazer, Janelle's debate teacher. Denise and Lee develop an unexpected mutual attraction for each other after Denise’s frustrations attempting to use dating apps.
 Shawn Harrison as William K., manager of the comedy club where Pat performs. At first, he tries to stop Pat from performing because he doesn't like her rough style of humor. After seeing how much the crowd loves her act, William K has a change of heart and decides to make her the club's headliner.
 Miya Golden as Tanika, Ashley's girlfriend, a chef who shares an apartment with Ashley in Chicago.
 Ebony Marshall-Oliver as Mildred Ford, Pat and Denise's mother. After Mildred's death in the first episode of season two, Pat reflects on the toxic relationship that she had with her mother. Pat imagines at Mildred's funeral that she has a spirited discussion with her when Mildred pops out of her coffin. Pat later flashes back to a traumatic incident when her mother verbally abused her for having "nappy" hair, unlike Denise.
 Richard Lawson as Major Carson, Terry's non-biological father. He and Terry struggle to fix their relationship because of Major's history of cheating on Terry's mother. In season two, he reveals a family secret to Terry that severely damages the relationship between Terry and Terry's mother.
 Janet Hubert as Jewell Carson, Terry's mother who looks down on Pat for her past as a drug dealer.

Episodes

Season 1 (2021)

Season 2 (2022)

Season 3 (2023)

Accolades

References

External links
 

2020s American black sitcoms
2021 American television series debuts
BET+ original programming
English-language television shows
Television shows set in Indiana
Television shows filmed in Atlanta
Television series about families
Television series by Imagine Entertainment